The men's 400 metres hurdles at the 1934 European Athletics Championships was held in Turin, Italy, at the  Stadio Benito Mussolini on 8 and 9 September 1934.

Medalists

Results

Final
9 September

Heats
8 September

Heat 1

Heat 2

Participation
According to an unofficial count, 7 athletes from 6 countries participated in the event.

 (1)
 (1)
 (1)
 (1)
 (2)
 (1)

References

400 metres hurdles
400 metres hurdles at the European Athletics Championships